Mike Lines (born August 30, 1970) is the former head coach of the National Lacrosse League's Minnesota Swarm. He was replaced by Joe Sullivan.

Minnesota Swarm

2010

Despite leading the Swarm to a 5-11 record during the 2010 regular season, it was good enough to earn the fourth playoff spot in the Western Division. However, Mike Lines' Minnesota Swarm fell the first-seeded Washington Stealth, the team that eventually won the championship that year, 14-10.

2011

Lines led the Swarm to a 2-1 start as of January 23, 2011. After the season, Lines was replaced by Joe Sullivan.

References

National Lacrosse League
National Lacrosse League coaches
Living people
1970 births